Kjósarhreppur, also known as Kjós , is a municipality in Iceland. It is the most northern part of the Capital Region and is adjacent to Reykjavík, Bláskógabyggð, and Hvalfjarðarsveit. Kjós is sometimes referred to as "a countryside in a city" due to its proximity to Reykjavík.

The primary industry in Kjós is agriculture. It is home to a number of lakes and rivers, including the Laxá í Kjós, one of the most popular sites for salmon fishing in the country.

External links

References

Municipalities of Iceland
Populated places in Capital Region (Iceland)